Merkid may refer to:

Merkit, a clan or a tribe of the Mongols
Flag of the Faroe Islands, also known as Merkið